Tamboo Mein Bamboo is a Hindi action film of Bollywood directed by Dil Kumar and produced by Satish Shetty. This movie was released on 14 December 2001 under the banner of Sheela Productions.

Plot
A village girl was brutally gang-raped by three men. She goes to the police for justice but they do not help the girl. When her boyfriend tries to help and give her justice, the rapists kill him. Then the innocent girl decides to take revenge on them.

Cast
 Raza Murad
 Birbal
 Satnam Kaur
 Nitin Bhandarkar
 Gurbachchan Singh
 Hitesh Sampat
 Bharat Ganeshpure
 Rohit

References

External links
 

2001 films
2000s Hindi-language films
Indian action films
2001 action films
Hindi-language action films
Indian rape and revenge films